The Islington Tunnel takes the Regent's Canal  under Angel, Islington, as the longest such tunnel in London.  The way for short boats and barges only opened in 1818; the pavements above are waymarked so the otherwise discontinued towpaths are connected.  The canal's Eyre's and Maida Hill Tunnels, to the west, are much shorter.

History
Islington Tunnel opened in 1818 and was built by the engineer James Morgan.

The Regent's Canal was authorised by Act of Parliament on 13 July 1812, and a month later James Morgan, who had previously produced plans and sections to support the application, was appointed as Engineer, Architect and Land Surveyor for the scheme. At the time, Morgan had little civil engineering experience, and the company decided to hold a competition for the design of the locks and tunnels, with the entries to be assessed by William Jessop and two other engineers. Although entries hoping to win the 50-guinea (£52.50) were submitted, none were accepted, and in December Morgan became responsible for the whole project.

The company was persistently short of money, as it had only succeeded in raising £254,100 of the estimated cost of £400,000, and as work progressed, it became obvious that more would be needed. The first section from Paddington Basin to Camden was opened on 12 August 1816, and some work had been done on the tunnel, but work stopped, as there was no more money. Another Act of Parliament increased the capital to £600,000, but the company had no success in raising any more. However, a chance meeting between the former chairman, Charles Munro, and the committee for the Society for the Relieving of the Manufacturing Poor resulted in discussions about government loans funding the project and providing employment for the poor. The Exchequer Bill Loan Commission was set up under the powers of the Poor Employment Act of 1817, with commissioners given powers to award loans to public projects which would provide employment for those without work. The engineer Thomas Telford surveyed the unfinished canal and tunnel on behalf of the Commissioners, and an initial loan of £200,000 was promised, providing that the canal company could raise £100,000 in match funding. This they succeeded in doing, and work resumed in December 1817. The canal opened in its entirety on 1 August 1820.

The tunnelling contract was given to Daniel Pritchard, who had previous experience building tunnels for the Grand Union Canal at Husbands Bosworth and Crick. They had been completed despite encountering difficult geology along their routes. With the completion of the  Islington Tunnel and the nearby Maida Hill Tunnel, he went on to be a specialist tunnelling contractor, completing the Strood Tunnel on the Thames and Medway Canal and the second Harecastle Tunnel on the Trent and Mersey Canal.

Lacking towpath, barges originally had to be legged through the tunnel. In 1826 it was upgraded with a steam tug pulling a guiding chain above the centre of the bed which would propel the barges; which remained until the 1930s, when it was replaced with a diesel engine, now defunct due to boats' motor propulsion.

Route
There is no towpath. Walkers or cyclists wishing to follow the tunnel are helped by a trail of waymarkers which have been set into the pavements above. From the eastern portal heading towards the west, the trail runs up Duncan Street, then left down Islington High Street to the crossing near Angel Underground Station, across High Street and up Liverpool Road, turning left into Chapel Market. At the end of Chapel Market it turns right into Penton Street, and finally left into Maygood Street. At the end of Maygood Street it passes through a small residential zone, before ultimately ending in Muriel Street, from where the towpath may be accessed.

Gallery

See also

Canals of the United Kingdom
History of the British canal system

Bibliography

References

Canal tunnels in London
Buildings and structures in Islington
1818 establishments in England
Tunnels completed in 1818
Regent's Canal